Equal Rights Party was the name several different nineteenth-century political parties in the United States:

 National Equal Rights Party, a women's rights party that had two presidential candidates
 The Locofocos, active during the 1830s and 1840s
 The Anti-Rent party active during the 1840s and 1850s created from the Anti-Rent War